Free is the eighth studio album by Canadian singer-songwriter Jann Arden, released in 2009 featuring the single "A Million Miles Away". The album debuted at #9 on the Canadian Albums Chart. The album includes Arden's version of the Michael Bublé single "Lost", which is co-written by Arden. American country music group SHeDAISY perform background vocals.

Track listing
"Free" (Jann Arden, Kristyn Osborn, Connie Harrington)
"Daughter Down" (Arden, Osborn, Harrington)
"The Devil Won" (Arden)
"Yeah You" (Arden, Osborn)
"Away" (Arden)
"Until This" (Arden, Osborn)
"You Are Everything" (Arden)
"Everybody's Broken" (Arden, Osborn)
"A Million Miles Away" (Arden, Russell Broom)
"All the Days" (Arden)
"Lost" (Michael Bublé, Arden, Alan Chang, Amy Foster-Gilles, Philip Noone)

Personnel
 Adapted from AllMusic:
 Chris Graffagnino - guitar
 Kristyn Kassidy - backing vocals
 Bruce Leitl - bass, keyboards, percussion
 Kelsi Osborn - backing vocals
 SHeDAISY - backing vocals
 Jonathan Yudkin - banjo, cello, Celtic harp, resonator guitar, mandocello, mandola, mandolin, orchestra bells, double bass, triangle, viola, violectra, violin
 Jann Arden - vocals

Charts

Certifications

References

Jann Arden albums
2009 albums
Universal Music Canada albums